Loyd Wainscott (October 26, 1946 – December 5, 2010) was an American football linebacker. He played for the Houston Oilers from 1969 to 1970.

He died on December 5, 2010, in Spring, Texas at age 64.

References

1946 births
2010 deaths
American football linebackers
Texas Longhorns football players
Houston Oilers players
People from Texas City, Texas